The 1949 Summer International University Sports Week were organised by the International University Sports Federation (FISU) and held in Merano, Italy, between 28 August and 4 September.

Sports
  Athletics
  Basketball
  Cycling
  Fencing
  Football

References

 
1949
S
S
Summer International University Sports Week
Multi-sport events in Italy
Summer International University Sports Week
Merano